Senova is a defunct automobile marque owned by the Chinese automaker BAIC Motor, itself a subsidiary of BAIC Group. It was launched in March 2012.

History
At the end of 2009, BAIC Group acquired the intellectual property rights to the Swedish car maker Saab's 9-3 and 9-5 models and related powertrain technologies in order to support the development of its own-brand vehicles.

The first Senova production model, the Senova D20, a subcompact five-door hatchback, went on sale in China in March 2012.

The production version of the Senova D70 made its debut at the 2012 Guangzhou Auto Show.

The Senova name was discontinued in 2020.

Products

The current Senova range comprises the following models:
Senova D20, a subcompact five-door hatchback and four-door sedan
Senova D50
Senova D60 (Discontinued in 2017)
Senova CC (Discontinued in 2017)
Senova D70 (formally Beijing Auto C70G)
Senova D80 (Discontinued in 2017)
Senova X25
Senova X35
Senova X55
Senova X65 (Discontinued in 2017)

Concept cars
A number of Senova concept cars were unveiled at the 2012 Auto China, including the C50E mid-sized sedan, the C60F executive sedan, the C90L luxury sedan and the C51X SUV. Exclusively, the Concept 900 (S900) and the C90L are first prototypes of Italian design studio Fioravanti made for Senova.

Sales
The Senova D20 sold 20,008 units from its launch in March 2012 to the end of the year. It was the first Senova model on sale in the period.

References

External links
Official website 

Vehicle manufacturing companies established in 2012
Cars of China
BAIC Group brands
Chinese brands
Luxury motor vehicle manufacturers